Friesach/Hirt Airport is a private use airport located  south-southeast of Friesach, Kärnten, Austria.

See also
List of airports in Austria

References 

Airports in Austria
Carinthia (state)